Sunny Side! is an album by the American folk music group the Kingston Trio, released in 1963 (see 1963 in music). It reached number 7 on the Billboard Pop Albums chart. The lead-off single was "Desert Pete" b/w "Ballad of the Thresher". The single was the last Top 40 single for the group. Members of the Western Writers of America chose it as one of the Top 100 Western songs of all time.

Preview copies of the album that were sent to radio stations and music critics contained the track "Woody's Song." Negative feedback led to Capitol removing it from the album. "Woody's Song" appeared on "Rediscover," a rarities album released by Folk Era Records in 1985, under the title of "Folksinger's Song."

Reception

Allmusic critic Bruce Eder thought the album was a "rushed recording" due to the success of "Reverend Mr. Black". He wrote: "The major problem with the album is that too many of the songs here sound like they're stuck at (or shouldn't have gotten past) the demo stage"

Reissues
Sunny Side! was reissued along with The Kingston Trio #16 on CD by Collectors Choice Records in 2000.
In 2000, all of the tracks from Sunny Side!, including the deleted "Woody's Song," were included in The Stewart Years 10-CD box set issued by Bear Family Records.

Track listing

Side one

 "Desert Pete" (Billy Edd Wheeler)
 "Marcelle Vahine" (Augie Goupil)
 "Sing Out" (Michael Stewart)
 "Ballad of the Thresher" (Nat Allen, Keith Donald, Alice Nielsen)
 "Blowin' in the Wind" (Bob Dylan)
 "Goo Ga Gee" (Mike Settle)

Side two

 "Jackson" (Wheeler)
 "Two-Ten, Six-Eighteen (Doesn't Anybody Know My Name)" (Rod McKuen)
 "Those Brown Eyes" (Woody Guthrie, Alan Arkin, Bill Carey, Erik Darling)
 "Those Who Are Wise" (John Stewart)
 "Rider" (Nick Reynolds, Bob Shane, Judy Henske)

Personnel
Bob Shane – vocals, guitar
Nick Reynolds – vocals, tenor guitar, bongos, conga
John Stewart – vocals, banjo,
Glen Campbell - 6 string banjo on "Desert Pete", 12 string guitar
Dean Reilly – bass

Production notes
Voyle Gilmore – producer

Chart positions

References

1963 albums
The Kingston Trio albums
Albums produced by Voyle Gilmore
Capitol Records albums